Hawarden is a village in the Canadian province of Saskatchewan within the Rural Municipality of Loreburn No. 254 and Census Division No. 11. The village is located on Highway 19 north of Strongfield, Loreburn, and Elbow.

Hawarden was named after Hawarden Castle in Flintshire, Wales, the country home of British politician and four-time prime ministerWilliam Gladstone.

The village contains a post office, the Hawarden Hall, a playground and a bar. Throughout the years, it has contained an elementary school, Perry Industries, indoor skating rink, bank, gas pumps, arcade, two churches, two convenience stores (including KC's Lucky Dollar and Jack & Mary's), surplus store, four grain elevators and a café.

History 
Hawarden incorporated as a village on July 16, 1909.

Canadian Bank of Commerce was opened 1909 but burned down on December 12, 1911 along with much of Gladstone Street during a fire.
A new Canadian Bank of Commerce was built in 1922 and is one of only two known existing buildings with the same architectural type in Saskatchewan.

On July 5th, 1988 a tornado damaged much of the town, uprooting trees and knocking boxcars off the railway.

Demographics 

Events

Beginning in 2001, the Hawarden Winter Warriors have hosted the Annual Hawarden Vintage Snowmobile Rally. The rally includes a 97 km (60 mi) trail for new snowmobiles and a 32 km (20 mi) trail for vintage snowmobile. The event starts at the Hawarden Hall, and has included many vintage snowmobiles, snow planes, great prizes and raffles.

Also beginning in 2001 was Bert's Boxing Day Classic, a rec hockey tournament in memory of Brendan Ringdal. The annual tournament was held in Hawarden until 2010, when it was moved to Kenaston due to the closure of the Hawarden rink.

Hawarden's 90th Anniversary Celebration was held in 1999, with a parade, performances by local talent (including the Whistlers), and fireworks.

Hawarden's 100th Anniversary Celebration was held in 2009, with a parade, slo-pitch tournament, fireworks, and a dance.

See also 

 List of communities in Saskatchewan
 Villages of Saskatchewan
 Hawarden Castle

References

Villages in Saskatchewan
Loreburn No. 254, Saskatchewan
Division No. 11, Saskatchewan